The Shona languages (also called the Shonic group) are a clade of Bantu languages coded Zone S.10 in Guthrie's classification. According to Nurse & Philippson (2003), the languages form a valid node. They are:

Eastern Shona group
 Ndau (S.15)

Central Shona group
 Korekore (S.11) and Tawara
 Zezuru (S.12)
 Manyika (S.13) and Tewe
 Karanga (S.14)

Western Shona group
Kalanga (S.16)
Nambya

In the 1920s, the Rhodesian administration was faced with the challenge of preparing schoolbooks and other materials in the various languages and dialects and requested the recommendation of the South African linguist Clement Doke. Based on his 1931 report, Standard Shona was developed from the Central Shona varieties. Because of the presence of the capital city in the Zezuru region, that variety has come to dominate in Standard Shona.

Some classifications include the Shonic group in Southern Bantu, with the other Zone S languages; others treat it separately.

References

 Doke, Clement M. Report on the Unification of the Shona Dialects. Government of Southern Rhodesia: Government Blue Book, 1931.